is a Japanese voice actress from Kanagawa Prefecture. She is affiliated with Haikyō.

For her stage name she has adopted the hiragana rendering  instead of the original kanji representation of her birth name Nozomi Sasaki. (This combination of kanji characters is also used for rendering the name of Nozomu Sasaki, an unrelated male voice actor, and she shares the same name as Nozomi Sasaki, a model, which would be too close.)

Filmography

Anime
 A Certain Magical Index as Misaka Sisters
 A Certain Magical Index II as Misaka Sisters
 A Certain Magical Index III as Misaka Sisters
 A Certain Scientific Accelerator as Misaka Sisters
 A Certain Scientific Railgun S as Misaka Sisters
 Aokana: Four Rhythm Across the Blue as Mayu Ganeko
 Bokura ga Ita as Nanami Takahashi (debut)
 Durarara!! as Haruko
 Hakushaku to Yōsei as Brownie B (ep 3)
 Hell Girl: Three Vessels as Kaede Inao (ep 9)
 Honto ni Atta! Reibai-Sensei as Chinatsu Akagi
 Idolmaster: Xenoglossia as Suzuna
 Jewelpet as Sapphie/Io
 Jewelpet Kira Deco as Sapphie/Io
 Jewelpet Sunshine as Sapphie/Io
 Jewelpet Twinkle as Sapphie/Io
 Jinrui wa Suitaishimashita as Fairy
 Kimi ni Todoke as Ayako Nonohara
 Kimi ni Todoke 2nd Season as Ayako Nonohara (eps 0–1)
 Kurokami The Animation as Mayu (eps 1–2)
 Lucky Star as Patricia "Patty" Martin
 Lucky Star OVA as Patricia "Patty" Martin
 Les Misérables: Shōjo Cosette as Charlotte
 My-Otome 0~S.ifr~ (OAV) as Kyouko Tsumabuki
 Ojarumaru as Saori; Tsukimi
 Princess Lover! as Ayano Kaneko
 Rinshi!! Ekoda-chan as Mōkin
 Shiki as Ritsuko Kunihiro
 Sora no Manimani as Izumi
 Winter Garden as Aiko
 Yotsunoha (OAV) as Ren
 Yumeiro Pâtissière as Yōko Ayukawa (5 episodes)
 Yumeiro Pâtissière SP Professional as Yōko Ayukawa (eps 62–63)
 Yahari Ore no Seishun Love Come wa Machigatteiru. as Hina Ebina
 Yahari Ore no Seishun Love Come wa Machigatteiru. Zoku as Hina Ebina

Video games
 Fire Emblem Fates - Felicia, Oboro
 Fire Emblem Warriors - Oboro
 Fire Emblem Heroes - Felicia, Oboro, Sue
 Soul Calibur V - Pyrrha Alexandra
 Brave Sword × Blaze Soul (2015), Mistilteinn
 Aokana: Four Rhythm Across the Blue as Mayu Ganeko
 MeiQ: Labyrinth of Death as Glenn of Fire
 Granblue Fantasy as Danua
 Azur Lane as Eldrige

References

External links
  
 Nozomi Sasaki at Hitoshi Doi's Seiyuu Database
 

1983 births
Living people
Voice actresses from Kanagawa Prefecture
Japanese video game actresses
Japanese voice actresses
21st-century Japanese actresses
Tokyo Actor's Consumer's Cooperative Society voice actors